Ingebjørg Harman Bratland (born 8 May 1990 in Edland, Vinje, Telemark) is a Norwegian folk singer, kveder and artist. In 2008–2009, she attended Foss Upper Secondary School in Oslo.

Early life 
Bratland began singing as a kveder when she was five years old, and was notable for her ability to perform folk songs, stev and ballads. She started taking singing lessons at an early age, primarily from Ellen Nordstoga. In 2004, at age 14, she received the 'Eckbo legaters folkemusikkpris'. As a kveder, Bratland won the C-class at Landskappleiken traditional music competition four times. In 2009, she won the vocal class A during the Norwegian championship in traditional folk music at Geilo. She is the Nordic Champion in traditional folk music and, in 2009, received the Vinje Municipality Culture Scholarship. In 2010, Bratland was awarded the Fureprisen, which included NKR 50 000.

Career 
In 2013, Bratland released the album Heimafrå together with Odd Nordstoga. She was awarded the 2013 Spellemannprisen in the category "traditional folk music" for this album. She was nominated for the 2014 Spellemannprisen in the category "folk music" for her first solo album Berre Meg. Her second solo album, Månesinn, was released in 2015. The album contains tunes Bratland wrote herself, with the producers Espen Lind and Geir Hvidsten. Following her performance at the 2016 Spellemannsprisen, a remix of the single "Stjernene" with the rapper Lars Vaular as guest artist was released.

She contributed the song "Mitt hjerte alltid vanker" on H. K. H. Kronprinsesse Mette-Marits Sorgen Og Gleden and participated in other concerts and performances, including Den fyste song for H. M. Kong Harald in connection with his 70th birthday (2007).

Bratland performed the title track of the children series Jul i svingen on NRK1. The series' music was written by Odd Nordstoga and was awarded the 2006 Spellemannprisen in the category Best music album for children. Bratland and Odd Nordstoga give a duet on the tune "Julevise". She participated in television broadcasts Kjempesjansen and Beat for Beat at NRK1, and Det store korslaget at TV2 Norway. She performed Nordahl Grieg's "Til Ungdommen" a cappella at the memorial concert in Oslo Cathedral 30 July 2011.

Honors 
 2009: Winner of vocal category A during the Norwegian championship of traditional folk music at Geilo
 2013: Spellemannprisen in the category Traditional folk music with Odd Nordstoga for the album Heimafrå

Discography

Solo albums 
 2014: Berre Meg (Universal)
 2015: Månesinn (Universal)
 2017: Bror
 2020: Papirfly

Collaborations 
 2013: Heimafrå (Universal), with Odd Nordstoga

References

External links 
 
Ingebjørg Bratland at Store Norske Leksikon 
Ingebjørg Bratland – Intervju + Ingen som du (2014) on YouTube 

21st-century Norwegian singers
Norwegian folk singers
Norwegian composers
Spellemannprisen winners
1990 births
Living people
People from Vinje
21st-century Norwegian women singers
Vitamin Records artists
NorCD artists